Motherwell Bridge railway station served the town of Motherwell, in the historical county of Lanarkshire, Scotland, from 1871 to 1885 on the Lesmahagow Railway.

History 
The station was opened on 4 February 1871 by the Caledonian Railway. It was situated to the south of the current Motherwell station.

References 

Disused railway stations in North Lanarkshire
Former Caledonian Railway stations
Railway stations in Great Britain opened in 1871
Railway stations in Great Britain closed in 1885
1871 establishments in Scotland
1885 disestablishments in Scotland
Buildings and structures in Motherwell